Saloca diceros is a species of spider found in Europe.

References

diceros
Spiders of Europe
Spiders described in 1871